Thomas Gibson (born 1962) is an American actor and director.

Thomas or Tom Gibson may also refer to:

Politics
Thomas Gibson (banker) (1667–1744), English banker, Member of Parliament (MP) for Yarmouth (Isle of Wight) and Marlborough
Thomas Gibson (American politician) (1750–1814), American Revolutionary War soldier and Auditor of the state of Ohio
Thomas Milner Gibson (1806–1884), British Member of Parliament and Cabinet Minister
Thomas K. Gibson (1811–1900), Wisconsin state senator in the 1st Wisconsin Legislature
Thomas Gibson (Canadian politician) (1825–1901), Canadian political figure from Ontario
Thomas Gibson-Carmichael, 1st Baron Carmichael (1859–1926), Scottish Liberal politician and colonial administrator
Tom Gibson (Scottish politician) (1893–1975), Scottish nationalist activist
Thomas F. Gibson (born 1956), American journalist and a White House staff member in the administration of President Ronald Reagan

Sportspeople
Thomas Gibson (rugby union) (1880–1937), British rugby player
Tommy Gibson (1888–unknown), Scottish footballer
Thomas Gibson (rower) (born 1982), Australian rower

Others
Thomas Gibson (physician) (1647–1722), English physician and anatomist
Thomas Gibson (artist) (–1751), English artist
Thomas Field Gibson (1803–1889), Unitarian silk manufacturer and philanthropist
Thomas Gibson Bowles (1841–1922), founder of the magazines The Lady and the English Vanity Fair
Thomas Gibson (priest) (1847–1927), Dean of Ferns
Tom Gibson (screenwriter) (1888–1950), American screenwriter and film director
Thomas Gibson (surgeon) (1915–1993), Scottish plastic surgeon
Tom Gibson (photographer) (1930–2021), Canadian photographer
Thomas Dean Gibson (born 1988), American missing child

See also 

 Shawn Gibson, soldier, also known as Tom Gibson